The Savernake Forest LTC Tournament was a late Victorian era grass court tennis tournament staged in mid October 1880 at the Savernake Forest, LTC, Savernake, Wiltshire, England, which ran for just one known edition.

History
The Savernake Forest LTC Tournament was a tennis event staged in mid October 1880. It was organised by Savernake Forest Lawn Tennis Club with the event being held on the Savernake Forest cricket club grounds, Savernake, Wiltshire, England. The first and final winner of the men's singles was Ireland's George R. M. Hewson.

Location and venue
Savernake is a civil parish immediately south and southeast of Marlborough, Wiltshire, England. The Savernake Forest LTC, founded in 1878, held its first known tournament in 1880 on the Savernake Forest Cricket Club grounds (S.F.C.C.).

Finals

Men's Singles
(Incomplete roll)

References

Defunct tennis tournaments in the United Kingdom
Grass court tennis tournaments
Sport in Wiltshire